Sandra Giles, born Lelia Bernice Giles, (July 24, 1932 – December 25, 2016) was an American actress and model. She was best known for her film debut role in Daddy-O in 1958, as well numerous other film roles, including It Happened at the World's Fair, opposite Elvis Presley, in 1963.

Biography
Giles was raised in Hooker, Oklahoma, but moved to Los Angeles with her mother, who had recently divorced. (Other sources say that she came from San Antonio, Texas, or that she was "born in Oklahoma and brought up in San Antonio, Tex.") Later described by The Hollywood Reporter and other critics as a "blond bombshell", Giles was discovered by a press agent while working at Canter's delicatessen, which began her career as an actress and model. She later studied dramatics at Los Angeles City College.

Giles made her film debut in 1958's Daddy-O, starring alongside Dick Contino. In the film, her character, Jana Ryan, beat Contino's character in a drag race. She went on to appear in three more films in 1958 along – The Matchmaker, A Lust to Kill, and Lost, Lonely and Vicious, in which she showed herself quite the dancer. Also in 1958, Giles made a memorable arrival at the film premiere of Teacher's Pet, starring Clark Gable, by arriving in a furry pink Cadillac convertible. Her appearance brought her career considerable publicity, including a two–page article and spread in Life Magazine, titled "The Blond From Hooker – How to Become a Movie Star", in which she was photographed in a bubble bath.

Her other film roles included Black Spurs in 1965, Flareup in 1969, and Black Gunn in 1972, as well as television credits ranging from Columbo to Land of the Giants.

Personal life
She dated tennis player Bobby Riggs during the 1970s and appeared with him in a guest spot on The Odd Couple.

She was close friends with fellow actresses Vikki Dougan, Pat Sheehan, Juli Reding, Sondra Scott, and Cathy Crosby.

She was married two times and had a daughter, singer Sandra Piller.

Death
Giles died in Los Angeles from complications of bullous pemphigoid, an autoimmune disease affecting the skin, on December 25, 2016, at the age of 84.

Filmography

Films
1958: Lost, Lonely and Vicious as Darlene
1958: Daddy-O as Jana Ryan
1958: The Matchmaker as Older Beauty
1959: A Lust to Kill as Belle
1963: It Happened at the World's Fair as Lily
1965: Black Spurs as Sadie's girl
1967: Border Lust
1969: Flareup as Nikki
1972: Black Gunn as Prostitute
1973: The Mad Bomber as Checkout Girl

Television
1978: Are You in the House Alone? as Hostess
1979: Crisis in Mid-Air as Darlene
1981: Crazy Times as Esther
1990: Columbo: Murder in Malibu as Sixth Woman

References

External links

Sandra Giles at Find a Grave

1932 births
2016 deaths
American film actresses
American television actresses
American stage actresses
Female models from California
Actresses from Los Angeles
People from Texas County, Oklahoma
Female models from Oklahoma
Burials at Forest Lawn Memorial Park (Glendale)
21st-century American women